Gidra may refer to:

 Nickname for Serbian actor Dragomir Bojanić (1933–1993)
 Nickname for Serbian martial artist Miodrag Stojanović (1950–2001)
 Gidra (newspaper) (1969-1974), Asian-American monthly
 Gidra (river), river in Slovakia
 Gidra language, another name for the Wipi language